Claude Harris Jr. (June 29, 1940 – October 2, 1994) was an American politician.

A Democrat from Alabama, he served in the United States House of Representatives from 1987 until 1993. He was succeeded in the House by Earl F. Hilliard.

Biography
Born in Bessemer, Alabama, Harris earned his B.S. at the University of Alabama at Birmingham in 1962, graduated from University of Alabama Law School in 1965 and served in the Alabama Army National Guard. He was an assistant district attorney in Tuscaloosa County until 1977 when he took seat as a state circuit judge. He stepped down from the bench in 1985 to run for Congress to succeed Richard Shelby, who ran for the United States Senate. Harris was elected three times in 1986, 1988, and 1990. He declined to run for reelection in 1992 after the legislature reconfigured his district into a majority-minority district in compliance with provisions in the Voting Rights Act, having little chance of being elected in the new district.

After leaving Congress, Harris was appointed United States Attorney for the Northern District of Alabama under the new Clinton administration in 1993. Harris died of lung cancer on October 2, 1994, in Birmingham, Alabama.

He was married to Barbara Harris; they had two sons.

References

External links

 

 

1940 births
1994 deaths
People from Bessemer, Alabama
United States Attorneys for the Northern District of Alabama
Alabama state court judges
American prosecutors
University of Alabama at Birmingham alumni
University of Alabama School of Law alumni
Democratic Party members of the United States House of Representatives from Alabama
20th-century American lawyers
20th-century American politicians
20th-century American judges